Rebounce is a 2011 Danish drama film written and directed by . The film won a Robert Award for Best Children's Film at the 2012 Robert Awards.

Cast
 Frederikke Dahl Hansen as Louise
  as Susan
 Kirsten Olesen as Marianne
 Niels Skousen as Henning
 Dar Salim as Hans
 David Dencik as Marcel
 Marco Ilsø as Niclas
 Coco Hjardemaal as Kat
  as Mie
 Søren Christiansen as Mikkel
 Peder Bille as Ung mand på grill

References

External links
 
 
 

2011 films
2011 drama films
2010s Danish-language films
Danish drama films
Zentropa films